Camilo Delgado (May 29, 1927 – February 8, 2005) was a Puerto Rican television show host and producer.

Career 
Delgado's interest in the dramatic arts sprouted at a young age and he acted in high school productions of Spanish plays such as Puebla de Mujeres and Prohibido Suicidarse en Primavera. While attending college in Puerto Rico, he founded the drama club at the "Instituto Politecnico" (Interamerican University) which eventually led to the creation of the university's drama department.

He pioneered television in Puerto Rico and appeared regularly as an actor, announcer, MC, talk show host, and producer. The son of a school principal and an elementary school teacher, he graduated from the American Academy of Dramatic Arts in New York City with honors in 1957. After acting in numerous off-Broadway productions such as The Heiress, Shakhuntala, and The Summer House, he returned to Puerto Rico and became a leading man in soap operas such as Concierto de Amor and Bajo el Vuelo de los Alcatraces. In 1970, he became an independent producer and created hits such as Sabado Gigante, Field Day por Television, Gane con Subaru, Volando con Pan Am and pioneered morning television in his country with Despierta Puerto Rico.

Delgado produced TV shows with a high quality standard, avoiding vulgarity or sensationalism.  Nonetheless, he publicly opposed any kind of censorship on the content of television programs.

Personal life 
Camilo Delgado was born on May 29, 1927 in Carolina. He was married to Diana Santiago for 55 years. On February 8, 2005 he died  peacefully in his sleep  at the age of 78 of natural causes. He was buried at Cementerio Borinquen Memorial Park I in Caguas, Puerto Rico.

Trivia 
His older son, Camilo Delgado Jr., also became a television show host during the early 1970s and eventually became a leading psychotherapist, author, workshop leader, and mental health administrator in Miami, Florida.

His younger son, Eric Delgado, is a film producer whose client roster includes Hillary Clinton, Diane Sawyer, Ricky Martin and the current and past governors of Puerto Rico. Eric Delgado is also a former television show host and is the President of WIPR-TV.

His brother, Mario Delgado, Ph.D., is a retired university professor and academic administrator.

Filmography 
 1962: Strangers in the City as Jose Alvarez 
 1966: Fantasía... 3
 1969: El escuadrón del pánico

References

External links 
 
 Biography of Camilo Delgado

1927 births
2005 deaths
American Academy of Dramatic Arts alumni
People from Carolina, Puerto Rico
Puerto Rican male actors
Puerto Rican television hosts